Polyploca korbi is a moth in the family Drepanidae. It is found in Turkey and on the Greek island of Samos.

The wingspan is 29.5–33 mm.

The larvae feed on Quercus pubescens and Quercus infectoria. They can be found in April and May.

Etymology
The species is named for Max Korb, who first discovered the species.

References

Moths described in 1901
Thyatirinae
Moths of Asia
Moths of Europe